Four ships of the British Royal Navy have been named HMS Venerable:
 The first , launched in 1784, was a 74-gun third rate. She was Admiral Adam Duncan's flagship at the Battle of Camperdown and was wrecked in 1804.
 The second , launched in 1808, was also a 74-gun third rate, on harbour service from 1825, and broken up in 1838.
She was sold to the Royal Netherlands Navy in 1948 and renamed , and later sold to the Argentine Navy and renamed .

Royal Navy ship names